Mayberry is an unincorporated community in Wayne County, Illinois, United States.

References

Unincorporated communities in Wayne County, Illinois
Unincorporated communities in Illinois